Broken Allegiance is a fan film that made its debut on the internet in April 2002, created by Australian fans of the Star Wars franchise. It is a live-action drama set in the Star Wars universe, taking place a few weeks between the events in A New Hope and The Empire Strikes Back. It tells the story of two Sith apprentices, Ruan and Calis, who have escaped the Empire by fleeing Coruscant in a stolen transport. They must fight for their freedom when Darth Vader sends the vicious bounty hunter Korbain Thor to track them down.

The film started pre-production in January 2001, and was shot both in studio and on locations around Melbourne in Victoria, Australia. The film was made entirely with volunteer cast and crew.

In a departure from most fanfilms, Broken Allegiance features an original symphonic score by composer Rich Johnson, which was performed by the Johnson Film Orchestra.

Upon release, the film garnered major media coverage and was screened at numerous local and international film festivals to great response. Since its release, the film has been downloaded worldwide in excess of 1 million times. A sequel project was announced in 2003, but was cancelled in 2005 when the director decided to pursue an original feature film concept.

The film won the Audience Favorite Award in the 2003 I-CON Film Festival, and was a finalist in the 2002 Australian Effects and Animation Awards.

Fan Films Quarterly magazine listed Broken Allegiance as one of the 10 most pivotal moments in fan film history in its Summer 2006 issue.

External links
 Official Site 
 Broken Allegiance at TheForce.Net
 

2002 films
2002 independent films
Fan films based on Star Wars
Australian independent films
Australian science fiction films
Films shot in Melbourne
2000s English-language films
2000s American films
2000s Australian films